Dietrich Christensen (born 19 February 1909, date of death unknown) was a German sailor. He competed in the mixed 6 metres at the 1936 Summer Olympics.

References

External links
 
 
 

1909 births
Year of death unknown
German male sailors (sport)
Olympic sailors of Germany
Sailors at the 1936 Summer Olympics – 6 Metre
Place of birth unknown
Place of death unknown